The Donald E. Stephens Convention Center, formerly known as the Rosemont/O'Hare Exposition Center, is a convention center located in Rosemont, Illinois, a suburb of Chicago. It is located near O'Hare International Airport, Allstate Arena, Rosemont Theatre, and Fashion Outlets of Chicago. The facility is named after the late mayor of Rosemont, Donald E. Stephens.

Notable events held annually include:
Midwest FurFest
The Chicago RV and Boat Show
The International Gem and Jewelry Show
Anime Central
Anime Midwest
Fan Expo Chicago
Islamic Society of North America Convention

The American Numismatic Association held their annual "World's Fair of Money" here in 1991, 1999, 2011, 2013, 2014, 2015, 2019, 2021 and 2022.

See also
 List of convention centers in the United States

References

External links 

Rosemont, Illinois
Convention centers in Illinois
Buildings and structures completed in 1975
Event venues established in 1975
Buildings and structures in Cook County, Illinois
Tourist attractions in Cook County, Illinois
1975 establishments in Illinois